Christopher William Weller (25 December 1939 – 4 June 2018) was a professional association footballer who played as a forward for eight different clubs over a 20-year career.

He began his career with his home town club, Reading, for whom he played as an amateur, before moving on to Bournemouth & Boscombe Athletic (now known as A.F.C. Bournemouth) in 1959. He made 111 appearances, scoring 26 goals, in two spells with The Cherries which was interspersed with a brief stint at Bristol Rovers, where he played three games. After departing Bournemouth in 1967 he spent the remainder of his career playing and managing in non-League football around the south of England.

References

External links

1939 births
2018 deaths
Sportspeople from Reading, Berkshire
English footballers
Association football forwards
Reading F.C. players
AFC Bournemouth players
Bristol Rovers F.C. players
Yeovil Town F.C. players
Salisbury City F.C. players
Poole Town F.C. players
Ringwood Town F.C. players
English Football League players
Shaftesbury Town F.C. managers
Wimborne Town F.C. managers
Brockenhurst F.C. managers
English football managers
Footballers from Berkshire